Sociedad Deportiva Lagunak is a Spanish football team based in Barañáin in the autonomous community of Navarre. Founded in 1975, it plays in Tercera División – Group 15. Its stadium is Estadio Sociedad Lagunak with a capacity of 500 seaters.

The club is better known for its women's team, which used to play in Primera División.

Season to season

5 seasons in Tercera División

External links
SD Lagunak on futnavarra.es  
navarrafutbolclic.com profile
Profile on Gobierno de Navarra

Football clubs in Navarre
Association football clubs established in 1975
1975 establishments in Spain